Steven Stanley (born 1958) is a Jamaican audio engineer and producer.

Steven Stanley is also the name of:

Steven M. Stanley (born 1941), American paleontologist and evolutionary biologist

See also
Stephen Stanley, Canadian singer-songwriter
Steve Stanlee (1920–2010),  American professional wrestler